Lydia Amanda Brewster Sewell (February 24, 1859 - November 15, 1926) was a 19th-century American painter of portraits and genre scenes.  Lydia Amanda Brewster studied art in the United States and in Paris before marrying her husband, fellow artist Robert Van Vorst Sewell. She won a bronze medal for her mural Arcadia at The World's Columbian Exposition in 1893. She continued to win medals at expositions and was the first woman to win a major prize at the National Academy of Design, where she was made an Associate Academian in 1903. She was vice president of the Woman's Art Club of New York by 1906. Her works are in several public collections.

Early life
Lydia Amanda Brewster, the daughter of Benjamin T. Brewster and Julia Ann Washburn Brewster, was born in North Elba, New York on February 24, 1859. Sewell painted William Brewster, a Mayflower passenger and one of her ancestors, when she was a young girl.

Education
In 1876, Sewell studied in the antique class of the National Academy of Design. She studied with Swain Gifford and Douglas Volk at the Cooper Union, the Art Students League of New York under William Sartain and William Merritt Chase In Paris, she studied under Tony Robert-Fleury and William-Adolphe Bouguereau at the Académie Julian; She also studied at Émile-Auguste Carolus-Duran's atelier and in 1886 exhibited at the Paris Salon for the first time and again in 1887 and 1888.

Marriage
She married Robert Van Vorst Sewell, a painter, on April 12, 1888. He was born in 1860 and became an Associate National Academian in 1901. The couple lived on Long Island, New York in the Fleetwood House in Oyster Bay. designed by her husband. He learned to be a sculptor to create wood carvings and sculptures for the house, fashioned after Medieval designs. American Homes and Gardens said it was among the country's most notable residences. They were on the Social Register in 1918. One of their sons, William Joyce Sewell, married Marion Brown, the daughter of artist Bolton Brown.

Career
After having completed her studies in Paris, Sewell opened a studio in New York. The painted portraits, including Mrs. Peter Cooper Hewitt, Mrs. Helen Jennings Ranger (wife of Henry Ward Ranger), Mrs. Flora Bigelow Dodge (wife of Charles Stuart Dodge, mother of Lucie Bigelow Rosen and Johnnie Dodge), and her husband, Robert Van Vorst Sewell. She was also a decorative painter. The National Academy of Design said that her "artistic tendencies were stimulated by the mountain scenery around her home and before she received any instruction she attained considerable facility in the use of color."

In 1888, Sewell won the Norman W. Dodge Prize at the National Academy of Design. Sewell exhibited her work at the Palace of Fine Arts and the Woman's Building at the 1893 World's Columbian Exposition in Chicago, Illinois. Kirsten Swinth says that "Amanda Brewster Sewell's Arcadia displayed her ability to paint the human figure, develop complex compositions, and manage the subject matter of history painting." Other works exhibited include Pleasures of the Past, Sylvan Festival, Mother and Son and By the River.

Sewell exhibited A Pastoral, A Sylvan Festival, and Pleasures of the Past at the Pennsylvania Academy of the Fine Arts exhibition between December 21, 1896 – February 22, 1897. She won a bronze medal at the 1901 Pan-American Exposition, a silver medal at the 1902 Charleston Exposition in South Carolina, a bronze medal at the 1904 St. Louis Exposition, and the Thomas B. Clarke prize for best figure composition at the 1904 National Academy of Design exhibition in New York for The Sacred Hecatomb. The painting, called an "important" work by The Independent, depicts dancing Greek maidens and children leading a procession of cattle to the sacrifice. Harper's Weekly commented, "These joyous figures, moving in a leafy glade into which the sunlight filters, are charming in color and rhythmic movement, and as a piece of admirably conceived and executed decorative painting it stands alone in the collection." She was the first woman to earn a major prize at the National Academy.

Her self-portrait was an Associate National Academian (ANA) diploma presentation on March 7, 1904; It was also exhibited with in the National Academy of Design Portraits exhibition held by the National Arts Club in 1916. By 1906 she was vice president and member of the selection jury of the Woman's Art Club of New York, which was formed in 1890 as a social club for women interested in art and as a forum to exhibit women artist's works.

Death
Sewell died in 1926 in Florence, Italy. Her husband, Robert Van Vorst Sewell died in 1924, also in Florence.

Collections

Awards

References

Further reading

External links

American portrait painters
American women painters
19th-century American painters
World's Columbian Exposition
1859 births
1926 deaths
20th-century American painters
People from Essex County, New York
Painters from New York City
National Academy of Design alumni
Cooper Union alumni
Art Students League of New York alumni
Académie Julian alumni
National Academy of Design associates
20th-century American women artists
19th-century American women artists